The Riverina Football Netball League (RFNL) is an Australian rules football and netball competition containing nine clubs based in the Riverina region of New South Wales, Australia. The league features three grades in the Australian rules football competition, with these being First-Grade, Reserve-Grade and Under 17s. In the netball competition, there are five grades, with these being A-Grade, A Reserve-Grade, B-Grade, C-Grade and Under 17s. In 2020, due to COVID-19 the Hume Football league team Osborne joined the competition for the 6 round season.

Currently a home and away season consisting of eighteen rounds is played. The best five teams then play off according to the McIntyre system, culminating in the RFNL Grand Final, which is traditionally hosted by Narrandera.

History
The Riverina Football League was formed in 1982 when the South West Football League (New South Wales), the Central Riverina Football League and the Farrer Football League amalgamated in order to create the Riverina Football League and the Riverina District Football League, with the latter changing its name to the Farrer Football League in 1985.

Current clubs

Former clubs

Timeline of clubs

Season structure

Pre-season
The Riverina Football League like most country leagues does not have a formal Pre-season competition.
As part of their Pre-season preparation clubs will often schedule between one and two practice matches with clubs from other leagues prior to the season beginning. These matches could take on different structures and were primarily conducted on a non-official basis with limited match officials and scores not being recorded.

Premiership season
The Riverina home-and-away season at present lasts for 18 rounds for a total of 16 matches and 2 byes per team. The season starts in mid April and ends in late August. Each team plays each other team twice - once at home and once away. Teams receive four premiership points for a win or bye and two premiership points for a draw. Ladder finishing positions are based on the number of premiership points won, and "percentage" (calculated as the ratio of points scored to points conceded throughout the season) is used as a tie-breaker when teams finish with equal premiership points.

Finals series
The Riverina football finals consisted of a 'Top-5' finals system.

The winning team receives a silver premiership cup, a premiership flag – a new one of each is manufactured each year. The flag has been presented since the league began and is traditionally unfurled at the team's first home game of the following season. Additionally, each player in the grand final-winning 
team receives a premiership medallion.

Due to the COVID-19 pandemic during the 2020 season a number of clubs did not participate. The remaining clubs took part in a six-round season and a 'Top-4' finals structure.

Finals structure
2020 Finals series

Notable players
The following footballers went onto play senior VFL football from the following clubs / leagues with the year indicating their VFL debut. 
South West Football League (New South Wales) (1910 to 1981)

 1925 - Joseph Plant - Narrandera to Richmond
 1925 - Les Stainsby - Coolamon to Collingwood
 1928 - Jack Haw - Leeton to Melbourne
 1931 - Geoff Neil - Leeton to St. Kilda
 1933 - George Schlitz - Leeton to St. Kilda
 1934 - George Pattison - Narrandera to Essendon
 1936 - Percy Bushby - Narrandrea to Essendon
 1948 - Laurie Carroll - Ganmain to St. Kilda
 1948 - Dudley Mattingly - Ganmain to St. Kilda
 1955 - Peter Curtis - Coolamon, Griffith to North Melbourne
 1957 - Tom Quade - Ariah Park Mirrool to North Melbourne
 1958 - Bill Box - Whitton to Essendon
 1960 - Des Lyons - Leeton to Carlton
 1961 - Jim Carroll - Ganmain to Carlton
 1961 - Tom Carroll - Ganmain to Carlton
 1966 - Mike Quade - Ariah Park Mirrool to North Melbourne
 1968 - Ross Elwin - Leeton to South Melbourne
 1968 - Bruce Reid - Leeton to South Melbourne

 1970 - Frank Gumbleton - Ganmain to North Melbourne
 1970 - Ricky Quade - Ariah Park Mirrool to South Melbourne
 1971 - Jim Prentice - Ariah Park Mirrool to South Melbourne
 1975 - Rod Coelli - Ardlethan to South Melbourne
 1975 - Terry O'Neil - Narrandera to South Melbourne
 1976 - Terry Daniher - Ariah Park - Mirrool to South Melbourne
 1977 - Wayne Evans - Grong Grong Matong to South Melbourne
 1978 - Russell Campbell - Gainmain to South Melbourne
 1979 - Wayne Carroll - Ganmain to South Melbourne
 1979 - John Durnan - Narrandera to Geelong
 1979 - Mark Fraser - Turvey Park to South Melbourne
 1979 - Max Kruse - Leeton to South Melbourne
 1980 - Stephen Eather - Turvey Park to South Melbourne
 1980 - Victor Hugo - Narrandera to South Melbourne
 1980 - Greg Smith - Ardlethan to South Melbourne
 1981 - Dennis Carroll - Ganmain to South Melbourne 
 1981 - Anthony Daniher - Turvey Park to South Melbourne
 1981 - Jack Lucas - Ariah Park - Mirrool to South Melbourne

Riverina Football League (1982 - 2023)

 1984 - David Murphy (Turvey Park)
 1984 - Paul Hawke (Wagga Tigers)
 1987 - Chris Daniher (Ariah Park-Mirrool & Coolamon)
 1987 - Matt Lloyd - (Mangoplah-Cookardinia United-Eastlakes)
 1987 - Peter Quirk - (Narrandera)
 1989 - Wayne Carey (North Wagga)
 1990 - Paul Kelly (Wagga Tigers)
 1992 - Jason Mooney (Turvey Park)
 1993 - Mark Pitura - (Turvey Park)
 1994 - Daniel McPherson (Ganmain-Grong Grong-Matong)
 1994 - Brad Seymour (Wagga Tigers)
 1999 - Cameron Mooney (Turvey Park)
 2000 - Ben Fixter (Wagga Tigers & Coolamon)
 2007 - Matt Suckling (East Wagga-Kooringal and Wagga Tigers)

 2011 - Isaac Smith (Temora, East Wagga-Kooringal and Wagga Tigers)
 2012 - Kurt Aylett (Leeton-Whitton)
 2012 - Harry Cunningham (Turvey Park)
 2012 - Orren Stephenson (Mangoplah-Cookardinia United-Eastlakes)
 2012 - Jacob Townsend (Leeton-Whitton)
 2013 - Zac Williams (Narrandera)
 2015 - Dougal Howard (East Wagga-Kooringal and Wagga Tigers)
 2016 - Harrison Himmelberg (Mangoplah-Cookardinia United-Eastlakes)
 2016 - Jacob Hopper (Leeton-Whitton)
 2016 - Matthew Kennedy (Collingullie-Glenfield Park)
 2017 - Harry Perryman (Collingullie-Glenfield Park)
 2018 - Sam Murray (Ganmain-Grong Grong-Matong)
 2021 - Matthew Flynn (Narrandera)
 2021 - Cooper Sharman - (Leeton-Whitton)

Wagga United Football Association
 1899 - Harry Lampe (Wagga Wagga)
 1924 - Alby Anderson - Royal Stars

 Riverina Main Line Football Association
 1923 - Tim Archer - Mangoplah

Wagga Australian Rules Football Association
 1929 - Bill Mohr (Wagga Tigers)

Footballers from the Riverina Football League who were drafted AFL, but did not play senior AFL football include:
 Jock Cornell - Geelong: (Mangoplah-Cookardinia United-Eastlakes)
 Max King - Melbourne: (Wagga Tigers)

Premiers

First-Grade

Reserve-Grade

Under 17s/18s

Under 18s 

1982: Ganmain-Grong Grong-Matong
1983: Ganmain-Grong Grong-Matong
1984: Leeton
1985: Ganmain-Grong Grong-Matong
1986: Turvey Park
1987: Turvey Park
1988: Wagga Tigers
1989: Griffith
1990: Turvey Park

1991: Griffith
1992: Wagga Tigers
1993: Wagga Tigers
1994: Coolamon
1995: Wagga Tigers
1996: Collingullie-Ashmont
1997: Wagga Tigers
1998: Wagga Tigers
1999: Griffith

2000: Turvey Park
2001: Wagga Tigers
2002: Narrandera
2003: Leeton-Whitton
2004: Mangoplah-Cookardinia United-Eastlakes
2005: Turvey Park
2006: Leeton-Whitton
2007: Leeton-Whitton
2008: Wagga Tigers

Under 17s 

2009: Wagga Tigers
2010: Leeton-Whitton
2011: Turvey Park
2012: Wagga Tigers
2013: Wagga Tigers
2014: Wagga Tigers

2015: Mangoplah-Cookardinia United-Eastlakes
2016: Griffith Swans
2017: Turvey Park
2018: Turvey Park
2019: Turvey Park
2020:

2021:
2022:
2023:

Final standings

2008 Ladder

2009 Ladder

2010 Ladder

2011 Ladder

2012 Ladder

2013 Ladder

2014 Ladder

2015 Ladder

2016 Ladder

2017 Ladder

2018 Ladder

2019 Ladder

See also 
AFL NSW/ACT
Australian rules football in New South Wales
Albury & District Football League 
Central Hume Football Association
Central Riverina Football League (1949 - 1981)
Coreen & District Football League
Farrer Football League
Group 9 Rugby League
Group 20 Rugby League
Group 17 Rugby League
Hume Football Netball League
Riverina Football Association (1924 to 1929)
South West Football League (New South Wales) (1910 - 1981)

References

External links
Official Riverina Football League website
AFL Riverina

Sport in the Riverina
Australian rules football competitions in New South Wales
Netball leagues in New South Wales